The Freckled Fish is a 1919 American silent comedy film featuring Oliver Hardy.

Cast
Chai Hong as Chai Chow
 Oliver Hardy as Solomon Soopmeat (as Babe Hardy)
 Eva Novak

See also
 List of American films of 1919
 Oliver Hardy filmography

External links

1919 films
1919 short films
1919 comedy films
American silent short films
American black-and-white films
Silent American comedy films
American comedy short films
1910s American films